Joyce Hatheway Poole (born 1 May 1956) is an elephant researcher based at the Gorongosa National Park in Mozambique.  Her body of research has led to discoveries about their social and sexual lives and their communicative and cognitive abilities. Her work and research on elephant societies played a central role in the eventual international ban on the trade of ivory.  She became the head of the Elephant Program for the Kenya Wildlife Service from 1990 to 1994.

She is the founder of the charity Elephant Voices, is the author of a memoir titled Coming of Age With Elephants, and has been the subject of numerous documentaries.

Early life
Born in Germany to American parents, she spent the first 6 years of her life in Connecticut when she moved with her parents to Malawi and then Kenya.  In 1966, when she was 11 years old, she went to one of primatologist Jane Goodall's lectures on her research with chimpanzees, and made a determination to become an animal behavior researcher. She graduated from Smith College in 1979 with a degree in biology and received her PhD in animal behavior from University of Cambridge in 1983.

Research and work
Poole's research has focused on communication behaviors in African bush elephants, and has identified more than 200 distinct vocal and physical expressions. She has also documented elephants using vocal imitation. This research helped support efforts to internationally ban the ivory trade. She is one of five co-authors of The Elephant Charter, an effort to provide a scientifically based guidance for those forming public policies related to elephants. She also co-founded ElephantVoices, a California-based non-profit elephant advocacy group, and has helped to establish multiple Africa-based elephant conservation projects.

Books

References

Women ethologists
1956 births
Living people
Elephant conservation
Smith College alumni
Alumni of the University of Cambridge
20th-century women writers
21st-century women writers